The first annual Mojo Awards, distributed by Mojo magazine, were held during Spring 2004 in London. The awards were produced by the Mojo magazine team and attendance was by invitation only.

Nominees
Complete list of nominees (winners in bold):

Catalogue Release 
Muzik City, The Trojan Records Story
Classic Album Award
Marquee Moon by Television
Hall of Fame Award
Arthur Lee
Hero Award
Roger McGuinn
Icon Award
Morrissey
Image Award
Bob Gruen
Inspiration Award
The Clash
Lifetime Achievement Award
James Brown
Maestro Award
Jimmy Page
Maverick Award
Red Hot Chili Peppers
The Mojo Medal
Geoff Travis of Rough Trade Records
Mondial Award
Sting
Songwriter Award
Ray Davies
Special Award
The Shadows
Vision Award
Led Zeppelin DVD

References

External links
Mojo magazine

Mojo
British music awards
2004 awards in the United Kingdom
2004 in London
Mojo